Arsalan Anjum Muhammad (born 15 May 1995) is a Pakistani cyclist. He rode in the time trial at the 2017 UCI Road World Championships.

Major results

2016 
 1st National Time Trial Championships

2017 
 61st 84th World Championships - ITT
 15th Asian Cycling Championships U23- ITT

2018 
 21st Asian Cycling Championships

References

1995 births
Living people
Pakistani male cyclists